Kherameh (also Romanized as Kherāmeh) is a city and capital of Kherameh County, Fars Province, Iran. At the 2006 census, its population was 21,683, in 5,189 families. Kherameh is surrounded by three lakes: Bakhtegan, Tashk and Maharlu.

There are several tourist places of interest in Kherameh including Bagh-haye Mehrabad (the Mehrabad Gardens), Tangab, 40 Cheshmeh, Doman nim and Ojagh Seyed.

The main occupation of the inhabitants is agriculture with wheat being the largest produced output.

References

Populated places in Kharameh County
Cities in Fars Province